P. Ravindra Reddy (24 June 1938 - 21 January 2016) was an Industrialist, pioneer in indigenization, import substitution of several critical technologies for India in the fields of Space, Nuclear Power, Defense, Oil, and Gas Exploration, among others. He was founder Chairman of MTAR Technologies Private Limited and was also Director of the Governing Body of the Antrix Corporation, from its inception in 1992 until 2013.

Early life
Ravindra Reddy was born in Alluru village, Madras Presidency, (now in Nellore district, Andhra Pradesh), India. He graduated with a B.E. in 1958 from College of Engineering, now Jawaharlal Nehru Technological University, Anantapur with specialization in Mechanical Engineering. After his graduation, Ravindra Reddy briefly attended Indian Institute of Science, Bengaluru.

Career
Ravindra Reddy was a leading technologist in the field of precision manufacturing and has made a significant contribution to the indigenous development of several technologies, from multi-stage satellite launch vehicles to achieving self-reliance for India in several areas of Nuclear Power generation, Missile technologies,  Oil and Gas exploration among others. After starting his career at HMT, Hyderabad, Reddy became an entrepreneur founding MTAR (Machine Tool Aids and Reconditioning), in Balanagar, Hyderabad, India. As Founder and visionary behind this small machine shop of 10 employees, Ravindra Reddy was instrumental in developing MTAR into a world-class precision Engineering firm that currently employs over 1,200 highly skilled workers across 7 divisions. His Organization manufactures sophisticated Liquid Propulsion Engines/Cryogenic Engine Systems that routinely launch Polar Satellite Launch Vehicles, that powered India's prestigious and pioneering Mars Orbiter Mission Mangalyaan and also PSLV-C37 that successfully launched 104 Satellites in a single flight setting a world record. He was also key to indigenizing many key components used in several Indian Nuclear Power Projects including Prototype Fast Breeder Reactor. Ravindra Reddy's MTAR is recognized as a key private partner in Defence Industry contributing to some important indigenous development of ICBMs such as Agni-V.

Ravindra Reddy's contributions to an important area for India's self-reliance was recognized by Awards such as one presented by Nobel Prize winner Mohamed ElBaradei, Director General IAEA, Vienna, in 2004 at Indian Nuclear Society, Mumbai,  for significant contributions in the nuclear field through innovative technologies and management approaches. He is also a recipient of “Defence Technology Absorption Award" in 2004, in recognition of the outstanding contribution made by the firm in technology absorption in the area of Agni Missiles, presented by Prime Minister of India Dr. Manmohan Singh. He was also awarded “Prof Y. Nayudamma Memorial Gold Medal” on 25 June 1993 by the Andhra Pradesh Academy of Sciences. Under his stewardship, a 100% EOU Division of MTAR Technologies was started which currently exports high-value assemblies to technologically advanced countries such as the USA, Israel, among others.

Ravindra Reddy was Chairman and main brain in establishing Samuha Engineering Industries Limited group Companies promoted for developing Aero Park/Aerospace and Precision Engineering SEZ at Adibatla, Hyderabad. He helped develop the infrastructure and now many industries are operational. He was also a member in Chief Minister Advisory Committee of combined Andhra Pradesh.

Fellowships/Memberships/Boards
Fellow, Indian National Academy of Engineering
Fellow, Indian Nuclear Society
Director, Antrix Corporation, commercial arm of Indian Space Research Organisation
Chairman, Samuha Engineering Industries Limited (SEIL)
Member, Chief Minister Advisory Committee of combined Andhra Pradesh on Technology

Awards
Ravindra Reddy has been awarded the following:
Dr. Yelavarthy Nayudamma Memorial Award- 1993
INS Industrial Excellence Award 2003
Defence Technology Absorption Award - 2004

References

1938 births
2016 deaths
Indian businesspeople
Indian industrialists